Channel One are an Irish electronic rock band.

Formation and history 
The band formed in 2002 and launched on the live circuit in 2004.

Channel One followed on from their two previous vinyl-only releases of "Not for the Last Time" and "Accelerate:Brake/Fun Radio" with their debut EP, Permissions in February 2007. The self-financed release was written, recorded and produced by the band in the Autumn 2006. It was due to be distributed through Sound Foundation Recordings.

Channel One played support to Hard-Fi at The Olympia on 9 April 2008 as part of the Bud Rising series of concerts in Dublin.

Discography

References 

Irish electronic music groups
Irish rock music groups
Irish electronic rock musical groups
Musical groups established in 2002